Dramatiques is the first studio album from the J-Urban artist Emi Hinouchi.

Track listing 
 Dramatiques Intro
 Trap
 hey boy...
 You said, You did feat. HI-D
 Freak!
 let it be
 brand new love
 Show Me What You Got
 What's Your Secret? feat. MIC BANDITZ
 Crying
 World
 You were my everything
 Magic
 Painful
 Magic (Magic CKB Tune remixed by CRAZY KEN BAND)

2003 albums